The Old China Trade refers to the early commerce between the Qing Empire and the United States under the Canton System, spanning from shortly after the end of the American Revolutionary War in 1783 to the Treaty of Wanghia in 1844.  The Old China Trade represented the beginning of relations between the United States and East Asia, including eventually U.S.–China relations. The maritime fur trade was a major aspect of the Old China Trade, as was illegal trafficking in opium. The trade era overlapped the First Opium War, which resulted from an attempt by China to enforce its prohibition on opium smuggling by Western traders and blockade-runners between 1839–1842.

Origins

Anglo-American hostilities ceased in 1783 following the Second Treaty of Paris that ended the American Revolutionary War and subsequently freed American trade from British control. At the time, increased global demand for tea was one of the primary reasons for a shortage of silver; this was the only currency that the Chinese, sole producers of the commodity at the time, would accept in payment. The East India Company (EIC), monopoly suppliers of tea to the English market, got around the problem by indirect sales of opium (grown on their plantations in India) to the Chinese, the proceeds from which they used to pay for tea.

The Americans meanwhile, also needed silver to finance their burgeoning international trade in furs, timber, and other commodities. They too looked to the Chinese market as a source of hard currency based on their monopoly of the opium trade in Turkey. The man who would become America's first consul in China, Bostonian and former Continental Army officer Samuel Shaw (17541794), arrived in the port of Guangzhou (then romanized as "Canton") in 1784 aboard the converted privateer Empress of China. The "Chinese Queen", as the vessel was known, under the command of Captain John Green, carried a cargo of silver specie and ginseng for trade. In Guangzhou, the Americans encountered many European nations already trading under the Canton System, including the English, Dutch, French, and Danish. Shaw subsequently negotiated the sale of the Empress cargo and earned a substantial profit. As well as symbolizing a breach of the British East India Company's tea monopoly, the successful and lucrative voyage of the Empress inspired other American merchants to follow suit with the desire to enter a new market with great potential for profit. By 1803, American vessels outnumbered British and all other nations in the trade. While more numerous, American vessels were smaller, averaging just under 300 tons each, compared with the "East Indiamen" from Europe, which averaged 1,200 tons each.

Growth

Two years after the voyage of the Empress, Shaw set up the firm of Shaw & Randall to advise American firms unfamiliar with trade in the Far East. Boston Brahmin Thomas Handasyd Perkins of Perkins & Co., the dominant American presence in the Turkish opium business, along with one of his partners and his 16‑year-old nephew John Perkins Cushing, subsequently opened operations in Guangzhou, where Russell & Co. had become the most important American opium dealer. The founders of Russell & Co., Samuel Russell, and Philip Ammedon, had set up in the Chinese city in 1808, buying opium at auction from the EIC in Bombay, which they then shipped clandestinely to Guangzhou on the south coast of China. By 1827 Russell and Co. had become the largest American opium dealer in China, competing in the market alongside British firms including Jardine, Matheson & Co. and Dent & Co. Of all the American firms, only Olyphant & Co. and one other abstained from the opium trade.

Trade with China, originally an enterprise of seemingly limited prospects involving significant risk instead turned out to be extremely lucrative. American traders, then with a stable foothold in Guangzhou, were eager to sell their goods to China, but the Chinese interest in foreign goods was limited. The first item that tended to sell in China was Spanish bullion: American traders would devote large sums of money to buying and amassing large quantities of the metal for export to China. The Spanish silver bullion was primarily used to complement the less profitable American goods such as cheese, grain, and rum. The use of bullion eventually became considerable with over $62 million worth of species traded to China between 1805 and 1825. This practice, however, gradually declined after 1815, when American merchants began to participate in "chain trade" routes —the buying and selling of goods en route to Guangzhou. The second major —and by far the most lucrative— American export to China was ginseng.  Hailed by the Chinese, among other cultures as shown by the genus' Latinate scientific name Panax as a panacea, the most potent and therefore most demanded type of ginseng, aralia quinquefolia, grew in Manchuria and the Appalachian Mountains. Transported from the interiors of Pennsylvania and Virginia to Philadelphia, New York, or Boston, ginseng was then shipped to China and sold for up to 250 times its weight in silver. Furs were the third-most lucrative American export to China.  Searching for another type of item that could be sold to the Chinese aside from specie and ginseng, Americans soon found that the mandarins had a taste for sea otter pelts, which could be inexpensively purchased from the Indians of the northwest coast of America and shipped to Guangzhou. The Chinese mandarins’ desire for bullion, ginseng, and furs was the primary impetus for America's initiation of trade with China. The return of the Empress of China, which had carried all three commodities, and her by the now rich crew to Boston in 1785 inspired other Americans to make similar voyages. However, different reasons emerged for maintaining trade with China.

There had always been a general American desire for foreign and sometimes exotic wares, and, with the British East India Company no longer the dominant force in American trade, the job of satisfying this demand fell to American merchants. Therefore, when the Empress returned home, she brought with her a large stock of outlandish Chinese goods, which her owners sold for a significant profit of $30,000—a 25% gain. Other American merchants did not take long to realize that, while selling American species, ginseng, and fur to the Chinese was undoubtedly profitable, selling Chinese goods in America would be considerably more so. Further motivation came from the knowledge that China, as a whole, had a mercantilist-like attitude towards foreign commerce; they tended to resist the importation of foreign goods because of a mixture of Confucian doctrine, which deprecated trade, and the underlying ethnocentrism felt by the Chinese—they did not need to actively search for trade because the inferior white "barbarian" states would instinctively bring it to them as a form of tribute. Because of these factors, American traders began to focus their funds on acquiring Chinese goods—a practice that the Chinese were more willing to adopt—rather than on purchasing those of America. What resulted was the flooding of Chinese teas, cotton, silks, rhubarb, cassia, nankeens (durable, yellow cloth), floor-matting, lacquerware, fans, furniture, and porcelains, into America, to the extent that even those of poor social classes possessed some Chinese items—perhaps a painting of Guangzhou's harbor or a pair of trousers made out of nankeen cloth.

The development of the Canton System

The Cohong monopoly and supercargoes

In 1757, the Qianlong Emperor of the Qing dynasty confined all Western trade to Guangzhou and regulated it through the use of merchants known collectively as the cohong.  This group owned a licensed monopoly on trade with foreigners and served as trading intermediaries accountable for their behavior and cargoes.  Relations between the Cohong and the foreign merchants were cordial and very peaceful, as both parties valued their reputations and had vested interests in preventing the disruption of trade.  The Cohong reviewed the cargo of each ship and collected tariffs that were then passed onto the Hoppo (Inspector of Customs).  The Cohong was at the mercy of the government's demands for revenue, and they had to add costs to the foreign merchants, in order to extract extra money for bribes to please the officials; although Qing Dynasty court officials did not actively supervise foreign trade, China's government treasury reaped the benefits of tariff revenues.  Additionally, each foreign vessel had to contract a comprador responsible for supplying the ship with provisions and servicing the factories onshore.

Before the rise of four American trading houses in the 1820s that controlled seven-eighths of the China trade by 1825—Perkins and Company, Jones Oakford and Company, Archer, and T. H. Smith—the American trade was conducted through the use of supercargoes.  Each American ship had a supercargo who acted as the commercial agent responsible for the purchases of Chinese goods.  He had to arrive and leave on his vessel.  It was not until 1800 that supercargoes began to establish themselves as resident agents in Guangzhou.  These agents either served trading houses or operated off of commissions from other private merchants' transactions. Upon their emergence, large trading houses, greater capitalization, and higher volumes of trade became possible.

Finding mediums of exchange

One of the largest problems faced by foreign traders in Guangzhou was finding a reliable medium of exchange that would enable sustainable trade with the Chinese.  The Chinese were always willing to accept bullion, in exchange for tea and other products.  This was because the Chinese were fairly self-sufficient and did not have a large desire for foreign goods.  Specie was very expensive and difficult to acquire considering that the supply coming from South America fluctuated and it required a lot of goods to attain through a trade.  Unable to afford to sustain high-level trading in specie, British merchants turned to the lucrative drug trade, obtaining trading rights for opium from India and importing it to the Qing Empire.  Beginning in 1767 and rapidly expanding through the early 1800s, opium was illegally traded for specie with the Chinese and then reinvested in tea for importation to Great Britain.

The Americans had less difficulty finding a variety of different products to barter for tea.  The Empress of China and the following early vessels were able to use ginseng and some species to secure tea. Yet, the market for ginseng was rather small, so the Americans began trading furs with Indian tribes in the American Northwest, which was in turn traded for species in Guangzhou, which was then used to purchase tea.  From 1790 to 1812 supplies of furs and then sealskins were depleted and new products had to be found as demand also waned. In the Pacific Islands, merchants evaded cannibals and traded with natives to get sandalwood and sea slugs that could be traded for species.  But those items soon ran their course, and by 1814 species had risen to nearly 70% of total American exports.  In the 1820s, they attempted to compete with the British opium trade that monopolized the Indian crops by trading for Turkish opium.  Massachusetts General Hospital, McLean Hospital and the Boston Athenæum, the Bunker Hill Monument, many factories, mines, the US's first railroad, university buildings, high schools, public libraries, and an orphanage were built with the proceeds of opium smuggling. The opium trade allowed the US to transfer China's wealth to fuel the industrial revolution.

The innovation of the British credit system and issuance of banking bills allowed the American traders to clear their debts with co-hong merchants and gradually substitute their cargoes away from carrying specie and more towards domestically manufactured items.  The Americans could then later pay off the principal and interest on their loans to the British banks.  From 1830 to 1850, faster and larger tea clippers were introduced, thereby replacing the earlier, smaller privateering vessels from the American Revolution.  As a result, Americans could achieve greater scale with the combination of tea clippers and British credit.  Tea could be transported to American markets in less time and with greater freshness, translating into higher profits. By 1834, tea accounted for over 80% of the American trade from China.

American diplomacy in China

The American trade in Guangzhou existed primarily through private traders and without the supervision and supporting authority of the United States government.  Soon after 1784, an American consul was appointed in Guangzhou and functioned as a reporting agent on trade to the U.S. government.  The consul was not recognized by the Chinese authorities or the hoppo, and was not allowed to fly the American flag over its factory until well after 1799. The Americans had to trade with the Chinese as subordinates instead of equals and use the Cohong for any and all demands.   Consequently, the Americans did not have the leverage to raise political or legal protests and had to submit themselves to the Chinese justice system that believed in a "life for a life" and holding groups accountable for the actions of individuals.  The chief concern of foreign traders was preventing the Chinese from closing trade, as they could threaten to do over legal disputes.

Denouement

At the end of the First Opium War in 1842, Britain and China signed the Treaty of Nanking, which effectively overthrew the original mercantilist system and forced open the ports of Guangzhou, Xiamen ("Amoy"), Fuzhou ("Foochow"), Ningbo ("Ningpo"), and Shanghai to British trading. Seeing that Britain could easily eliminate foreign competition in China with its new privileges and considerable trading prowess, Americans found the need to reestablish their diplomatic relations and commercial equality in China. For the previous fifty-nine years, Americans had been interacting with China merely through their business transactions, without government-to-government communication. As a result, the administration of President John Tyler sent the commissioner Caleb Cushing to negotiate a treaty in which America would receive the same privileges as Britain. Cushing, in the Treaty of Wanghsia in 1844, not only achieved this goal but also won the right of extraterritoriality, which meant that Americans accused of crimes in China were to be tried by American courts only. This treaty was monumental in that it laid the foundation for a more extensive and regulated American trade with China; American ships would no longer make the sporadic—and somewhat reckless—voyages to China so characteristic of the Old China trade.

Category of the trade

Fine art

Porcelain

In the late 18th century, Chinese porcelain could be purchased from two sources: the licensed Hong merchants or the porcelain specialized shopkeepers.

Porcelain specialized shopkeepers

From the records, the original porcelain market was concentrated on a street several blocks north of the thirteen factory area. Until 1760, after the Co-hong was created, all the small shopkeepers were moved to a new street on the quay which was later referred to as "China Street" (called Jingyuan Jie 静远街/靖远街 in Chinese). There were about 180 different names of porcelain shops from foreign trade records between 1700 and 1800. However, since many of them appear in records only once or for a few years, there were only a total of 25 to 30 shops dealing with the porcelain business. Most of the porcelain dealers in Guangzhou were small, family-run operations with sales of less than 1,000 taels of merchandise a year, while a few of them could manage to reach an annual gross sale of 10,000 taels per year. Each year, porcelain dealers generally placed their order to manufacturers at Jindezhen from October to December. The items were completed and shipped to Guangzhou in August or September for export. From the early 1780s to the 1810s, the export market started to shrink. Records show that in 1764, there were 20,116 piculs exported, while in 1784, the porcelain export declined to 13,780 piculs. Although it reached 25,890 piculs in 1798, soon the porcelain exports shrank to only 6,175 piculs in 1801. Finally, the amount of porcelain exported remains at an average level of 6,000 piculs per year around the 1820s. The reason for the drastic change in amounts of porcelain exported could result from the increase in the porcelain price due to the increasing labor cost and Chinese duties on exporting porcelain.

Legacy of the Old China Trade in Salem, Massachusetts

Noted China Trade merchants

 William Henry Aspinwall
 George Cabot
 John Perkins Cushing
 Elias Hasket Derby
 Fanning & Coles
 John Murray Forbes
 Robert Bennet Forbes
 Charles W. King
 Abiel Abbot Low
 Gideon Nye
 David Olyphant
 Joseph Peabody
 Thomas Handasyd Perkins
 Russell Sturgis
 John Renshaw Thomson
 Israel Thorndike
 William Shepard Wetmore
 John Jacob Astor

See also

 Foreign relations of Imperial China
 History of the west coast of North America
 Paul Jones (1843 ship)
 Turkey merchant

References

Citations

Further reading

 
 
 
 
 
 
 
 Haddad, John R. America's First Adventure in China: Trade, Treaties, Opium, and Salvation (2013) online
 
 

 
 Morris, Richard J.  "Redefining the economic elite in Salem, Massachusetts, 1759-1799: A tale of evolution, not revolution." New England Quarterly 73.4 (2000): 603-624. online
 Richards, Rhys (1994), "United States trade with China, 1784-1814" The American Neptune, a special supplement to Vol 54. 
  Various reprints.

External links

 Forbes House Museum (Milton, Massachusetts)
 Peabody Essex Museum

China–United States economic relations
History of foreign trade of the United States
History of foreign trade in China
Illegal drug trade in Asia
Drugs in China